The Abbey of Thelema is a small house which was used as a temple and spiritual centre, founded by Aleister Crowley and Leah Hirsig in Cefalù (Sicily, Italy) in 1920.

The villa still stands today, but in poor condition. Filmmaker Kenneth Anger, himself a devotee of Crowley, later uncovered and filmed some of its murals in his film Thelema Abbey (1955), now considered a lost film.

Name
The name was borrowed from François Rabelais's satire Gargantua and Pantagruel, where an Abbaye de Thélème is described as a sort of "anti-monastery" where the lives of the inhabitants were "spent not in laws, statutes, or rules, but according to their own free will and pleasure." Prior to arriving at the name, Crowley referred to the house as Villa Santa Barbara.

Objectives

This idealistic utopia was to be the model of Crowley's commune, while also being a type of magical school, giving it the designation "Collegium ad Spiritum Sanctum", A College towards the Holy Spirit. The general program was in line with the A∴A∴ course of training, and included daily adorations to the sun, a study of Crowley's writings, regular yogic and ritual practices (which were to be recorded), as well as general domestic labor. The object was for students to devote themselves to the Great Work of discovering and manifesting their True Will.

Crowley had planned to transform the small house into a global center of magical devotion and perhaps to gain tuition fees paid by acolytes seeking training in the Magical Arts; these fees would further assist him in his efforts to promulgate Thelema and publish his manuscripts.

Residents

Raoul Loveday

In 1923, a 23-year-old Oxford undergraduate, Raoul Loveday (or Frederick Charles Loveday), died at the Abbey. His wife, Betty May, variously blamed the death on his participation in one of Crowley's rituals (allegedly incorporating the consumption of the blood of a sacrificed cat) or the more probable diagnosis of acute enteric fever contracted by drinking from a mountain spring. Crowley had warned the couple against drinking the water, as reported in biographies by Lawrence Sutin, Richard Kaczynski and others.

When May returned to London, she gave an interview to a tabloid paper, The Sunday Express, which included her story in its ongoing attacks on Crowley. With these and similar rumors about activities at the Abbey in mind, Benito Mussolini's government demanded that Crowley leave the country in 1923. After Crowley's departure, the Abbey of Thelema was eventually abandoned and local residents whitewashed over Crowley's murals.

Jane Wolfe
Jane Wolfe worked with Crowley's Thelemic system of training in Cefalù for three years, and emerged from those years with a degree of attainment, having survived Crowley’s ordeals. Whilst a resident at the Abbey of Thelema, Wolfe was admitted to the A∴A∴ by Crowley, taking the magickal name Soror Estai. She undertook various practises including yoga, dhāraṇā and pranayama of which she kept a detailed record which was later published by the College of Thelema of Northern California as The Cefalu Diaries. She later worked as Crowley’s personal representative in London and Paris.

In popular culture
Danish artist Joachim Koester created five colour and five black and white photographs of the villa; these photographs comprise his Morning of the Magicians (2005) work.

Gallery

See also
List of abbeys and priories

References

Citations

Works cited

Further reading

External links

Photos of the Abbey from 2005
Abbey of Thelema film on IMDB
Photos from cefalù
"No resurrection without psychoplastic re-shape". An article by the Austrian Philosopher Andreas L. Hofbauer about the Abbey, original pictures of the replica of the Chambre des Cauchemars by the artist René Luckhardt and about ritual chambers in general

1920 establishments in Italy
1923 disestablishments in Italy
20th century in Sicily
Buildings and structures in the Province of Palermo
Monasteries in Sicily
Religious organizations disestablished in 1923
Religious organizations established in 1920
Secret societies in Italy
Thelema
Villas in Sicily